Mogodu is a Southern African food. Mogodu is a combination of chopped serobe (tripe) and mala (intestines) served as a stew often with hot pap or dumpling. Mala (in Setswana/Sotho) is the insides, usually of a mammal such as a cow or sheep.

See also

 List of porridges

References

 Mala Mogodu. Digital Innovation South Africa. https://web.archive.org/web/20120301092025/http://www.disa.ukzn.ac.za:8080/DC/IzApr83.1684.8071.000.000.Apr1983.4/IzApr83.1684.8071.000.000.Apr1983.4.pdf Retrieved 25 November 2009

Beef
Offal
Porridges
Southern African cuisine